The following lists events that happened during 1874 in South Africa.

Incumbents
 Governor of the Cape of Good Hope and High Commissioner for Southern Africa: Sir Henry Barkly.
 Lieutenant-governor of the Colony of Natal: Sir Benjamin Pine.
 State President of the Orange Free State: Jan Brand.
 State President of the South African Republic: Thomas François Burgers.
 Lieutenant-Governor of Griqualand West: Sir Richard Southey.
 Prime Minister of the Cape of Good Hope: Sir John Molteno.

Events
May
 27 – The first group of Dorsland Trekkers departs from Pretoria to settle in Angola, led by Gert Alberts.

Unknown date
 Work begins on the Cape Parliamentary buildings (the current South African houses of Parliament).
 The Cape Government passes legislation to begin government funding of education and colleges.
 The South African Teachers' Association is established in the Cape.
 The railway line from Port Elizabeth to Uitenhage is partially opened.
 Work is begun on the Verlatenkloof pass, connecting the town of Sutherland with the southern Cape.
 The Molteno Government of the Cape passes a parliamentary act to redraw the provincial boundaries of the Cape Colony, from two provinces (Eastern and Western Cape) to seven.
 The Molteno Regulations establish the South African public library system.
 The Burgerspond, the South African Republic's first coin, is introduced.

Births
 4 July? – Moloko Temo, South African supercentenarian. (d. 2009)

Deaths

Railways

Locomotives
 A single  0-4-0 saddle-tank locomotive is placed in railway construction service on the Midland System of the Cape Government Railways.
 A third locomotive enters service on breakwater construction work at Table Bay Harbour, a  Brunel gauge  side-tank engine built by Fletcher, Jennings & Co.

References

South Africa
Years in South Africa
History of South Africa